Andrew C. Richner is an attorney and Republican politician who served as a member of the Board of Regents of the University of Michigan and the Michigan House of Representatives.

Early life
Richner was born in Detroit on July 4, 1961 and attended school in Grosse Pointe. He earned both his bachelor's and law degrees from the University of Michigan. Richner was an intern in the Office of the White House Counsel under President Ronald Reagan. His first experience in elected office was as a member of the Grosse Pointe Park City Council, and later as a member of the Wayne County Commission.

Political career

State House
Richner won election to the Michigan House of Representatives in 1996 and served three terms. During that time, he was a member of the Michigan Commission on Uniform State Laws and the Securities Act drafting committee of the National Conference of Commissioners on Uniform State Laws.

University of Michigan Board of Regents
Richner was elected to the Board of Regents of the University of Michigan in 2002, and re-elected in 2010. He served two stints chairing the board.

Personal life
Richner is a member of the Clark Hill law firm in Detroit, working in its government and public affairs practice group.

Richner was a delegate to the 2004 Republican National Convention which nominated George W. Bush for a second term as President of the United States.

References

1961 births
Living people
University of Michigan Law School alumni
County commissioners in Michigan
Republican Party members of the Michigan House of Representatives
Regents of the University of Michigan
People from Grosse Pointe Park, Michigan